Ya'akov Berihon (born July 6, 1993) is an Israeli footballer. He plays for F.C. Ashdod in the Israeli Premier League.

References

External links
 
 

1993 births
Living people
Footballers from Rishon LeZion
Israeli footballers
Association football forwards
Hapoel Rishon LeZion F.C. players
Beitar Jerusalem F.C. players
F.C. Ashdod players
Liga Leumit players
Israeli Premier League players
Jewish Israeli sportspeople
Israeli people of Ethiopian-Jewish descent
Sportspeople of Ethiopian descent